Rudling is a surname. Notable people with the surname include:

John Rudling (1907–1983), English actor 
Per Anders Rudling (born 1974), Swedish-American historian